By Any Means is an American thriller directed by Leighton Spence and starring Brooke Burfitt, Thomas Gipson, Jonathan Cheban, and Michelle Money. The film had its first screening in Ireland before a run of international film festivals around the world in 2016. Gravitas Ventures acquired the distribution rights of the film; which will be released by video on demand and on DVD on June 27, 2017.

Awards 
By Any Means has been officially selected for a number of film festivals around the world, including Ramsgate Film Festival and was official selected for the Bermuda International Film Festival. The film won at the 2016 Wexford Film Festival where it took home the Best Film award and Brooke Burfitt for Best Actress. The film won Best International Feature Film at the Polish International Film Festival 2017.

In popular culture 
The film received some media attention after convicted kidnapper Lukasz Herba stated in the closing statement of his trial that he was inspired after watching the movie. Herba, a UK resident from Poland, was sentenced to almost 17 years in jail for his role in the abduction of Chloe Ayling in Milan in July 2017, eight weeks after the release of the film.

References

External links
 
 
 

2016 films
American thriller films
2016 thriller films
American independent films
Films set in New York (state)
2016 independent films
2010s English-language films
2010s American films